Salvador López Orduña (born 27 March 1953) is a Mexican politician formerly from the National Action Party. He has served as Deputy of the LVI and LVIII Legislatures of the Mexican Congress representing Michoacán.

He also served as Mayor of Morelia from 1996 to 1998 and again from 2005 to 2007 and also ran for the Governature of Michoacán in 2007.

See also
 List of municipal presidents of Morelia

References

1953 births
Living people
People from Morelia
Politicians from Michoacán
Municipal presidents in Michoacán
National Action Party (Mexico) politicians
21st-century Mexican politicians
Instituto Tecnológico Autónomo de México alumni
20th-century Mexican politicians
Members of the Chamber of Deputies (Mexico) for Michoacán
Deputies of the LVIII Legislature of Mexico